Happoshu (発泡酒 happōshu lit. "sparkling alcoholic beverage"), or low-malt beer, is a tax category of Japanese liquor that most often refers to a beer-like beverage with less than 67% malt content. The alcoholic beverage is popular among consumers for having a lower tax than beverages that the nation's law classifies as "beer." Although the happoshu label is most frequently found on low-malt beer or beer-like products, alcopops that contain malt are also categorized as happoshu.

Japan's alcohol tax system divides beer-like malt beverages into four categories based on malt content: 67% or higher, 50 to 67%, 25 to 50%, and less than 25%.  An alcoholic beverage based on malt is classified as beer if the weight of malt extract exceeds 67% of the fermentable ingredients.  Since Suntory's introduction in 1994 of Hop's Draft, containing 65% malt, a market has emerged for low-malt, and recently, non-malt beer substitutes.

With alcohol tax revenues decreasing as a result of happoshu's popularity, the Japanese government eventually raised the nation's tax on low malt beers. In 1996, the tax for products containing 50 to 67% malt was raised to that of beer. Brewers followed suit by lowering the malt content of their products. Today, most happoshu contains less than 25% malt, putting it in the lowest tax category of low-malt beer.  In recent years, Japanese brewers have released dozens of brands in an attempt to increase their market share.  Many of these are marketed as more healthy products, with reduced carbohydrates and purines.  Another trend is to use unmalted barley, such as in Sapporo's Mugi 100% Nama-shibori.

Beer-flavored beverages collectively dubbed "the third beer"(第三のビール, dai-san no bīru) by the mass media have been developed to compete with happoshu. These  alcoholic products fall under categories not yet as highly taxed. The third beer beverages either use malt alternatives, or they are a mix of happoshu and another type of alcohol. When comparing 350 ml cans, the third beer brands can be 10 to 25 yen cheaper than happoshu.

In July 2012, Suntory, which had been the first company to sell happoshu, announced that it will stop selling it by Autumn 2012.

Due to the nature of allowable ingredients in beverages that can legally be sold as "beer" in Japan (malted barley/wheat, hops, and adjuncts rice, corn, sorghum, potato, sugar/caramel, and starch), many imported Belgian beers and North American craft beers are also designated as "happōshu", despite meeting the 67% malt requirement. This is somewhat similar to traditional German beer regulations' exclusion of foreign brews from the local definition of "beer". (See: Reinheitsgebot)

Brands
 Happoshu from 25% to 50% malt content: 
 Happoshu with less than 25% malt content: 
 Hokkaido Nama-shibori Migaki-mugi (Sapporo)
 Hon-nama (Asahi), available in Red and Aqua Blue label (low-carb) versions
 Diet-nama　Clear Taste (Suntory)
 Magnum Dry Golden Dry (Suntory)
 Cool Draft (Asahi)
 Tanrei-nama (Kirin), also available in Green Label (low-carb), and Tanrei W (reduced purines)
 Enjuku (Kirin)
 Style Free (Asahi)
 Dosan Sozai (Sapporo)
 Zero (Kirin)
 Alcohol classified as "Other miscellaneous (2)", containing no malt:
 Draft One (Sapporo) - uses pea protein
 Nodogoshi-nama (Kirin) - uses soy protein
 Slims (Sapporo) - uses pea protein
 Jokki-Nama (Suntory) - uses corn, also available in regular and strong versions
 Alcohol classified as "Liqueur":
 Super Blue (Suntory) - happoshu mixed with wheat spirits
 Strong Seven (Kirin) - happoshu mixed with barley spirits
 Hop No Shinjitsu (Kirin) - happoshu mixed with barley spirits
 Koku No Jikan (Kirin) - happoshu mixed with barley spirits
 Goku-uma (Asahi) - happoshu mixed with barley spirits
 Ajiwai (Asahi) - happoshu mixed with barley spirits
 Clear Asahi (Asahi) - happoshu mixed with barley spirits
 Asahi Off (Asahi) - happoshu mixed with barley spirits
 Mugi Shibori (Asahi) - happoshu mixed with barley spirits
 Mugi To Hop (Sapporo) - happoshu mixed with barley spirits
 Off No Zeitaku (Sapporo) - happoshu mixed with barley spirits
 Kinmugi [Rich Malt] (Suntory) - happoshu mixed with wheat spirits
 The Straight (Suntory) - happoshu mixed with wheat spirits

* "Dry beer" refers to beers with less residual sugars and a dry taste.
"Nama beer" generally refers to unpasteurized draught beer usually served from a pressurized keg. However, in the above brands,  it is merely a marketing term; compare to Miller Genuine Draft.

See also
Beer in Japan

References

 "Happoshu", Section 18, Article 3, Chapter 1, Alcohol Taxiation Act (酒税法, "Syuzei Hou"), Japan
 "Tariff", Article 23, Chapter 3, Alcohol Taxiation Act, Japan

Japanese alcoholic drinks
Types of beer